In geometric topology, a branch of mathematics, Moise's theorem, proved by Edwin E. Moise in , states that any topological 3-manifold has an essentially unique piecewise-linear structure and smooth structure.

The analogue of Moise's theorem in dimension 4 (and above) is false: there are topological 4-manifolds with no piecewise linear structures, and others with an infinite number of inequivalent ones.

See also
 Exotic sphere

References

Geometric topology